Michou may refer to:

Affectionate form of the name Michel (name) or Micheline (given name)
Michou (cabaret artist) (1931–2020), French cabaret owner, drag queen and singer
Michou (Réunion singer) (born 1960) Réunionnaise female singer
Michou (band), Canadian folk band 2007–2012
"Michou", Michelle Dumon (1921–2017), WWII Belgian resistance agent